

Bracket
Note: while the bracket below shows the entire knockout stage, the draw for the round of 16 matches was determined at the time of the group draw, and kept teams from East and West Asia completely separate for that round.

The draw for the quarter-finals and beyond was held separately, after the conclusion of the round of 16. Because of the country protection rule, if there are two clubs from the same country, they will not face each other in the quarter-finals. Therefore, the two clubs from Saudi Arabia may not be drawn with each other in the quarter-finals. However, the same rule does not apply if there are more than two clubs from the country. Therefore, the four clubs from the Korea Republic may be drawn against each other in the quarter-finals.

Round of 16
The draw for the round of 16 of the 2010 AFC Champions League was held on 7 December 2009, along with the draw for the group stage.

West Asia

East Asia

Quarter-finals

First leg

Second leg

Zob Ahan won 3–2 on aggregate.

Seongnam Ilhwa Chunma won 4–3 on aggregate.

Al-Hilal won 5–4 on aggregate.

Al-Shabab won 2–1 on aggregate.

Semi-finals

First leg

Second leg

4–4 on aggregate. Seongnam Ilhwa Chunma won on away goals.

Zob Ahan won 2–0 on aggregate.

Final

References 

Knockout stage